Evil Genes is a book by Barbara Oakley, a systems engineer, about the neurological and social factors contributing to chronic antisocial behavior. The text was published on October 31, 2007, by Prometheus Books.

The book has earned both praise and criticism for its treatment of what Oakley considers gaps in psychological research surrounding "successfully sinister" individuals—those who show subclinical symptoms of personality disorders, and who are often found in positions of authority in politics, religion, business, and academia.

See also
 Psychopathy
 The Mask of Sanity
 Snakes in Suits: When Psychopaths Go to Work
 The Psychopath Test

References

Further reading
 Erich Fromm: The Anatomy of Human Destructiveness

External links
 Official website

2007 non-fiction books
Science books
Criminology
Books about psychopathy